Acleris matthewsi is a species of moth of the family Tortricidae. It is found in Peru.

The wingspan is about 18 mm. The forewings are cream suffused with brownish and with a pale olive brown pattern, mixed with ochreous on the costa. The hindwings are glossy cream with brownish veins and peripheries.

References

Moths described in 1986
matthewsi
Moths of South America